Karaali is a village in the Fındıklı District, Rize Province, in Black Sea Region of Turkey. Its population is 40 (2021).

History 
According to list of villages in Laz language book (2009), name of the village is Karalishiavla, which means "Karali village". Karaali was part of Meyvalı village.

Geography

References

Villages in Fındıklı District